Pilníkov is a town in Trutnov District in the Hradec Králové Region of the Czech Republic. It has about 1,200 inhabitants. The town centre is well preserved and is protected by law as an urban monument zone.

Geography
It lies in the Giant Mountains Foothills. The town is situated at the confluence of the streams Pilníkovský and Starobucký.

History
The first written mention of Pilníkov is from 1357. The village was founded in the second half of the 13th century. It was promoted to a town by Vladislaus II in 1514. From 1623 to 1627, it was owned by Albrecht von Wallenstein. The town was badly damaged during the Thirty Years' War and depopulated, but it recovered. From 1675 to 1789, it was owned by a branch of the House of Schwarzenberg as a part of the Vlčice estate. From 1789 to 1868, the estate was held by the Barons Theers of Silberstein.

Sights
The main landmark is the Church of the Holy Trinity in the middle of the town square. The original wooden church was as old as the town. In 1604–1605, the brick Renaissance tower was added. After the wooden church fell into disrepair, it was demolished. In 1769–1772, it was replaced by a late Baroque building with Rococo elements. Its current appearance is from 1904, after it was damaged by a fire in 1820 and reconstructed.

There are preserved burgher houses on the town square.

References

External links

Cities and towns in the Czech Republic
Populated places in Trutnov District